Michael O'Dea may refer to:

Michael O'Dea (Irish politician) (died 1932), Irish Cumann na nGaedheal politician
Michael O'Dea (Australian politician) (born 1938), Australian solicitor and former local government politician

See also
Mick O'Dea, Irish artist